El Universal is a regional newspaper based in Cartagena de Indias, Colombia founded in 1948 by Domingo López Escauriaza and Eduardo Ferrer Ferrer. El Universal is member of the Latin American Newspaper Association, an organization of fourteen leading newspapers in South America.

References

Publications established in 1948
Newspapers published in Colombia
Spanish-language newspapers
Mass media in Cartagena, Colombia